Tamás Takács ( / ; born 20 February 1991) is a Hungarian football striker who plays for Kazincbarcika.

Career
Born in Subotica, SFR Yugoslavia, he played with FK Vinogradar, FK Subotica and FK Spartak Zlatibor Voda before joining Hungarian side Kozármisleny SE where he played until the end of the 2009–10 NB II season. In mid-2010 he signed with OFK Beograd and after playing two seasons in the Serbian SuperLiga, he was loaned, in mid-2012, to TSC Bačka Topola playing in the Serbian League Vojvodina.

On 29 June 2022, Takács returned to Kazincbarcika.

Club statistics

Updated to games played as of 27 June 2020.

References

External sources
 

1991 births
Sportspeople from Subotica
Living people
Hungarian footballers
Association football forwards
FK Spartak Subotica players
Kozármisleny SE footballers
OFK Beograd players
FK TSC Bačka Topola players
Szigetszentmiklósi TK footballers
Diósgyőri VTK players
Debreceni VSC players
Nyíregyháza Spartacus FC players
Mezőkövesdi SE footballers
Szeged-Csanád Grosics Akadémia footballers
Kazincbarcikai SC footballers
Csákvári TK players
Serbian SuperLiga players
Nemzeti Bajnokság I players
Nemzeti Bajnokság II players